Miguel Angel Ruiz (born 10 January 1975 in Mendoza) is an Argentine rugby union footballer. He plays as a loose forward or lock. He works at an office.

Ruiz played at Teque Rugby Club when he was selected for the Argentina squad that entered the 1999 Rugby World Cup finals. He played in three matches back then.

Ruiz had 25 caps for the "Pumas", from 1997 to 2002, scoring 2 tries, 10 points in aggregate.

External links
Miguel Ruiz Statistics

1975 births
Living people
Argentine rugby union players
Argentine expatriate sportspeople in Italy
Rugby union locks
Argentina international rugby union players
Sportspeople from Mendoza, Argentina